The following is a list of Sites of Special Scientific Interest in the Caithness Area of Search.  For other areas, see List of SSSIs by Area of Search.

 Achanarras Quarry
 Banniskirk Quarry
 Beinn Freiceadain and Ben Dorrery
 Berriedale Cliffs
 Berriedale Water
 Blar Nam Faoileag
 Broubster Leans
 Burn of Latheronwheel De-notified (confirmed) on 3 February 2012
 Castle of Old Wick to Craig Hammel
 Coire na Beinne Mires
 Craig Hammel to Sgaps Geo
 Dirlot Gorge
 Dunbeath Peatlands
 Dunbeath to Sgaps Geo
 Dunbeath Water
 Duncansby Head
 Dunnet Head
 Dunnet Links
 East Halladale
 Hill of Leodebest  De-notified (confirmed) on 3 February 2012
 Hill of Warehouse
 Holborn Head
 John o' Groats
 Knockfin Heights
 Knockinnon Heath
 Lambsdale Leans
 Langwell Water
 Leavad
 Loch Calder
 Loch Caluim Flows
 Loch Heilen
 Loch Lieurary
 Loch of Durran
 Loch of Mey
 Loch of Wester
 Loch of Winless
 Loch Scarmclate
 Loch Watten
 Long Berry Coast
 Lower Wick River
 Morven and Scaraben
 Moss of Killimster
 Newlands of Geise Mire
 Oliclett
 Ousdale Burn
 Pennylands
 Pentland Firth Islands
 Phillips Mains Mire
 Red Point Coast
 Reisgill Burn
 River Thurso
 Rumsdale Peatlands
 Sandside Bay
 Shielton Peatlands
 Sletill Peatlands
 Spittal Quarry
 Strathmore Peatlands
 Stroma
 Stroupster Peatlands
 Thrumster Mill Loch
 Ushat Head
 Westerdale Quarry
 Westfield Bridge
 Weydale Quarry
 Wick River Marshes

 
Caithness